The Price of Everything is a 2018 American documentary film directed by Nathaniel Kahn and produced by Jennifer Blei Stockman, Debi Wisch, Carla Solomon and Katharina Otto-Bernstein for HBO.

The film features interviews with people prominently involved in contemporary art and the market for it, including; artists Jeff Koons, Larry Poons, Njideka Akunyili Crosby and Gerhard Richter, George Condo, Marilyn Minter art dealer Gavin Brown, Sotheby's executive vice president Amy Cappellazzo, auctioneer Simon de Pury, collectors Stefan Edlis and Gael Neeson and Inga Rubenstein, and art critic Jerry Saltz.

The film takes its title from a quote from the 1892 Oscar Wilde play Lady Windermere's Fan delivered on screen by art collector Stefan Edlis: "There are a lot of people who know the price of everything and the value of nothing".

Awards

See also
The Lost Leonardo, 2021 documentary film about the most expensive art sale in history

References

External links
 
 The Price of Everything on HBO
 

2018 documentary films
Documentary films about the visual arts
Films scored by Jeff Beal
HBO documentary films
2010s English-language films
2010s American films